Morisi Mikhailovich Kvitelashvili (born 17 March 1995) is a Russian-Georgian figure skater who currently represents Georgia. He is the 2020 European bronze medalist, a three-time Rostelecom Cup medalist (including gold in 2021), a five-time Challenger series medalist (including gold at the 2017 CS Golden Spin of Zagreb), and the 2018 Georgian national champion.

Representing Russia, Kvitelashvili is the 2015 CS Mordovian Ornament bronze medalist. On the junior level, he is the 2013 JGP Czech Republic bronze medalist and the 2014 Russian junior national bronze medalist.

Kvitelashvili placed 24th at the 2018 Winter Olympics and progressed to 10th place at the 2022 Winter Olympics.

Personal life 
Kvitelashvili was born on 17 March 1995 in Moscow, Russia. His mother, a former competitive skater, and father are both originally from Tbilisi, Georgia.

As of 2018, he is a student at the Russian State University of Physical Education, Sport, Youth and Tourism in Moscow.

Skating career

Early years 
Kvitelashvili began learning to skate in 2000. His first coach was Elena Proskurina at CSKA Moscow.

He placed fourteenth at the 2011 Russian Junior Championships and eighteenth at the 2012 edition. He won the junior bronze medal at the 2012 NRW Trophy, his first international event.

2013–2014 season 
In 2013, Kvitelashvili was selected to compete on the ISU Junior Grand Prix (JGP); he placed fourth, 1.62 points behind bronze medalist Mikhail Kolyada, at his first event, which took place in September in Košice, Slovakia. The following month, he won the bronze medal at the JGP event in Ostrava, Czech Republic, having scored 17.76 points less than silver medalist Alexander Petrov and 16.7 more than Daniel Samohin. His senior international debut came in December, at the 2013 Winter Universiade in Trento, Italy, where he finished fifth.

2014–2015 season: Grand Prix debut 
Making his ISU Challenger Series (CS) debut, Kvitelashvili placed fifth at the Lombardia Trophy in September 2014. In November, he competed at the 2014 Rostelecom Cup, replacing the injured Kolyada; he finished twelfth at the event, the first senior Grand Prix (GP) assignment of his career. After placing eighth at the 2015 Russian Championships, he was sent to his second Winter Universiade and finished seventh at the competition, held in February 2015 in Granada, Spain.

2015–2016 season 
Kvitelashvili won the bronze medal at the 2015 CS Mordovian Ornament in Saransk, Russia. He finished twelfth at his sole GP event, the 2015 Cup of China. In December 2015, he placed fifth in his final international event for Russia, the CS Golden Spin of Zagreb, and twelfth at the Russian Championships. In May 2016, he submitted a request to Russian skating officials to be released to compete for Georgia.

2016–2017 season: First season for Georgia 
Kvitelashvili made his first international appearance for Georgia in December 2016 at the Santa Claus Cup in Hungary. He obtained the minimum technical scores required to compete at all ISU Championships and won the gold medal, ahead of fellow Georgian Irakli Maysuradze, by placing first in both segments. Ranked tenth in the short program and fourth in the free skate, he finished sixth overall at the 2017 European Championships, held in January in Ostrava, Czech Republic.

In March, Kvitelashvili placed nineteenth in the short, eleventh in the free, and thirteenth overall at the 2017 World Championships in Helsinki, Finland. Due to his placement, Georgia qualified a spot in the men's event at the 2018 Winter Olympics in Pyeongchang, South Korea.

2017–2018 season: PyeongChang Olympics 
Kvitelashvili competed at two Grand Prix events, placing fifth at the 2017 Rostelecom Cup and 6th at the 2017 Internationaux de France. He was invited to the Russian event as a replacement for Keiji Tanaka. He won medals at both of his Challenger Series events, taking silver at the 2017 CS Minsk-Arena Ice Star and gold at the 2017 CS Golden Spin of Zagreb.

In January, Kvitelashvili placed twelfth at the 2018 European Championships in Moscow. The following month, he served as Georgia's flag-bearer during the opening ceremony at the 2018 Winter Olympics in Pyeongchang, South Korea. He qualified for the free skate in men's singles and finished twenty-fourth overall.

2018–2019 season 
Beginning the season at the 2018 Ondrej Nepela Trophy, Kvitelashvili placed fourth in the short program and third in the free skate, narrowly finishing fourth overall, less than half a point behind Keiji Tanaka.  At his second Challenger event, the Finlandia Trophy, he placed fifth in the free skate and third in the free, taking the bronze medal overall.  His first Grand Prix event of the season, 2018 Skate America, saw him place eighth overall after coming eleventh in the short program and seven in the free skate.  At the 2018 Rostelecom Cup, he placed second in both programs to win the silver medal, his first Grand Prix medal.

Kvitelashvili placed tenth at the 2019 European Championships and finished the season with a thirteenth-place showing at the 2019 World Championships.

2019–2020 season: Bronze at Europeans 
Kvitelashvili was fourth to begin the season at the 2019 CS Ondrej Nepela Memorial before winning the Denis Ten Memorial Challenge.

At his first Grand Prix event of the season, Kvitelashvili placed fifth in both segments at the 2019 Internationaux de France, for fourth place overall.  He was seventh at the 2019 Rostelecom Cup.

Kvitelashvili won the bronze medal at 2020 European Championships after placing fourth in the short program and third in the free program.  Only 0.03 points away from winning the silver medal that went to Artur Danielian, he said he had "dreamed for a long time about this."  He was the first Georgian man to win a medal at the European Championships.

Kvitelashvili was assigned to compete at the 2020 World Championships in Montreal, but these were cancelled due to the coronavirus pandemic.

2020–2021 season 
With the pandemic continuing to affect international travel, the ISU opted to run the Grand Prix primarily based on geographic location, and Kvitelashvili was assigned to compete at the 2020 Rostelecom Cup.  He won the short program with a clean short program scoring slightly under one hundred points, in what was considered something of an upset.  Fourth in the free skate, he took his second silver medal from Rostelecom.  He said afterward that he was "happy how everything came together, even though not everything worked in the free skating."

Kvitelashvili placed fourteenth at the 2021 World Championships in Stockholm. As a result, one berth was qualified for Georgia at the 2022 Winter Olympics in Beijing.

2021–2022 season: Beijing Olympics 
Kvitelashvili began the Olympic season at the 2021 CS Lombardia Trophy, where he won the bronze medal. At his first Grand Prix assignment, the 2021 Skate Canada International, he placed last in the short program but fourth in the free skate, rising to sixth place overall. At his second assignment, the 2021 Rostelecom Cup, Kvitelashvili placed second in the short program with a new personal best score of 95.37, only 0.44 points behind segment leader Kazuki Tomono of Japan. He was third in the free skate, albeit with a new personal best, but this was sufficient for him to rise to first place, claiming his first Grand Prix gold medal. He said, "I have not really realized what I achieved here, but I think it will come in time. I will take great memories from this competition." He finished the fall season with sixth place at the 2021 CS Golden Spin of Zagreb.

At the 2022 European Championships, Kvitelashvili finished in sixth place.

Named to the Georgian Olympic team for the second time, Kvitelashvili began the 2022 Winter Olympics as the Georgian entry in the men's short program of the Olympic team event. Despite a rough triple Axel landing, he placed fourth in the segment, securing seven points for the Georgian team. Team Georgia did not advance to the second stage of the competition and finished sixth. Turning to the men's event, Kvitelashvili skated a clean short program and finished fifth in that segment. Eleventh in the free skate, he finished tenth overall.

Days after the Olympics concluded, Vladimir Putin ordered an invasion of Ukraine, as a result of which the International Skating Union banned all Russian and Belarusian skaters from competing at the 2022 World Championships. In addition, both Nathan Chen and Yuzuru Hanyu were absent due to injury, and as a result, the field was considered more open than typically the case. Kvitelashvili was able to attend, but his Russian coaches were not. He placed seventh in the short program after stepping out of his quad Salchow, but rose to fifth in the free skate and finished a career-best fourth overall, 5.35 points behind bronze medalist Vincent Zhou of the United States.

2022–2023 season 
In advance of the new season, Kvitelashvili opted to end his nearly decade-long association with coach Eteri Tutberidze, moving to Italy to train under Lorenzo Magri. He won the silver medal at the 2022 CS Finlandia Trophy in his inaugural outing with his new team, before turning to the Grand Prix, where he finished eighth at the 2022 MK John Wilson Trophy. He was twelfth at the 2022 Grand Prix of Espoo.

Kvitelashvili finished sixteenth at the 2023 European Championships.

Programs

Competitive highlights 
GP: Grand Prix; CS: Challenger Series; JGP: Junior Grand Prix

For Georgia

For Russia

Detailed results
Small medals for short and free programs awarded only at ISU Championships.

References

External links 
 

1995 births
Russian male single skaters
Living people
Figure skaters from Moscow
Russian sportspeople of Georgian descent
Male single skaters from Georgia (country)
Figure skaters at the 2018 Winter Olympics
Figure skaters at the 2022 Winter Olympics
Olympic figure skaters of Georgia (country)
Universiade medalists for Georgia (country)
Universiade medalists in figure skating
Competitors at the 2019 Winter Universiade
European Figure Skating Championships medalists
Competitors at the 2015 Winter Universiade
Competitors at the 2013 Winter Universiade